Solos and Duets is tenth studio album by Brazilian jazz artist Eliane Elias. The record was released in 1994 by Blue Note Records.

Background
This record is one of her most acclaimed albums; Allmusic gave it 4.5 stars out of five. The album consists of 11 solo and duet compositions performed by herself and Herbie Hancock in a manner of friendly piano duel. On duet compositions, Eliane Elias' part appears on the left channel, and that of Herbie Hancock on the right one. There was no overdubbing used to record the album. Her next piano-only album Mirror Mirror will be released only in 2021.

Reception
Scott Yanow of Allmusic wrote "This release is a change of pace for Eliane Elias. Instead of interpreting Brazilian songs, fusion, or modern bop, Elias shows off her classical technique on a set of acoustic solos plus six duets with Herbie Hancock. She really digs into the standards (sometimes sounding a little like Keith Jarrett) and creates some fairly free and unexpected ideas while putting the accent on lyricism. Some of the music is introspective, and there are wandering sections, but the net results are logical and enjoyable. As for the duets, Elias and Hancock mostly stay out of each other's way, which is an accomplishment when one considers that the four-part "Messages" is a series of free improvisations. There are playful spots (particularly on the adventurous ten-minute rendition of "The Way You Look Tonight") and, since Elias knows Hancock's style well (and was clearly thrilled to have him on the date), their collaborations work quite well. A successful outing."

Track listing

Awards
In 1995, the album was nominated for the Grammy Award in the "Best Jazz Solo Performance" category.

Personnel
Executive Producer – Christine Martin
Piano – Eliane Elias, Herbie Hancock (tracks: 3 6 8 9 10 11)
Producer – Eliane Elias
Recorded By – Stelio Carlini
Technician [Piano] – Dirk Dickten (tracks: 3 6 8 9 10 11), Giovanni Aronne (tracks: 1 2 4 5 7)

References

External links

1994 albums
Eliane Elias albums
Blue Note Records albums